Cormac Joseph Carney (born May 6, 1959) is a United States district judge of the United States District Court for the Central District of California.

Early life and education
Carney was born in Detroit, Michigan to Irish immigrant parents, both of whom were medical doctors. His father was a County Mayo Gaelic football player, Pádraig Carney. The elder Carney immigrated to the United States to further his medical career. Cormac was raised in Long Beach, California, where he attended St. Anthony High School. Carney received a Bachelor of Arts degree from the University of California, Los Angeles (UCLA) in 1983 and a Juris Doctor from Harvard Law School in 1987. He attended the U.S. Air Force Academy for one year before transferring to UCLA.

Football career
Carney was a wide receiver on the UCLA Bruins football team. He was named to the GTE/CoSIDA Academic All-America football team, and inducted into the CoSIDA Academic All-America Hall of Fame in 2005. He was also named to the 1981 and 1982 All-Pacific-10 Conference football teams.

A highlight of his college football career was UCLA's victory over Michigan in the 1983 Rose Bowl.

He played for the USFL team Memphis Showboats in the 1984 season. Carney made 37 receptions for 701 yards and 2 touchdowns.

Legal career
Carney practiced law Los Angeles for four years with Latham & Watkins and eleven years with O'Melveny & Myers.

Judicial service

California state court
In October 2001, Carney was appointed by Governor Gray Davis to the bench of the California Superior Court in Orange County. He served on the state bench, presiding over civil and criminal trials, until his appointment to the federal district court.

Federal district court

Appointment
On January 7, 2003, Carney was nominated by President George W. Bush to a seat on the United States District Court for the Central District of California vacated by Carlos R. Moreno. A substantial majority of the American Bar Association's Standing Committee on the Federal Judiciary rated Carney as "qualified" for the post, while a minority of the committee members abstained. (ABA rankings of judicial nominees are on a three-part scale: well-qualified, qualified, and not qualified.) Carney was confirmed by the U.S. Senate on April 7, 2003, on a vote of 80–0, and received his commission on April 9, 2003.

Notable decisions
In 2009, Carney dismissed fraud and conspiracy charges against two executives of Broadcom Corporation, a telecommunications company, because of prosecutorial misconduct. Carney also vacated a guilty plea by Broadcom co-founder Henry Samueli and dismissed a civil case brought by the Securities and Exchange Commission against four Broadcom executives. Carney found that the government had violated the defendants' right to a fair trial and right to due process by, among other things, engaged in conduct that "intimidated and improperly influenced" three important defense witnesses to try to prevent them from testifying and by leaking confidential grand jury proceedings.

In Jones v. Davis (2014), Carney issued an opinion and order declaring the California death penalty to be unconstitutional, writing that the system's arbitrariness and lengthy delays led to only a "random few" being executed by the state and violated the Eighth Amendment's ban on cruel and unusual punishment. (California at the time had 740 prisoners sentenced to die, but had executed only 13 people since 1978, the last one in 2006.) In a 29-page order, Carney vacated the death sentence of Ernest Dewayne Jones, who was sentenced to death in 1995 for rape and murder. The order was appealed by then-California Attorney General Kamala Harris. The U.S. Court of Appeals for the Ninth Circuit overturned Carney's ruling in November 2015; in a unanimous decision of three-judge panel, the appellate court noted that "Many agree with Petitioner that California's capital punishment system is dysfunctional and that the delay between sentencing and execution in California is extraordinary," but held that the district court could not consider a "novel constitutional theories" in reviewing a habeas corpus case. 

In  Fazaga v. FBI (2012), Carney dismissed most of plaintiffs' claims on the grounds of the state secrets privilege. In 2019, the Ninth Circuit affirmed in part and reversed in part, reviving some of plaintiffs' claims.

In United States v. Rundo (2019), Carney dismissed criminal conspiracy charges and rioting against Robert Rundo, the leader of the white supremacist Rise Above Movement group, and three of this followers, stemming from their attack on counter-demonstrators and a police officer in Berkeley, California, in July 2017. Carney ruled that the Anti-Riot Act of 1968 was facially overbroad in violation of the First Amendment. In 2021, the Ninth Circuit reversed Carney's ruling. Applying the Brandenburg v. Ohio standard, the court of appeals, in a per curiam decision, agreed that the portions of the act that make it a crime to organize a riot, or to encourage, urge, or promote a future act of violence, were unconstitutional, but held that the Act's prohibitions on "speech that instigates (incites, participates in, or carries on) an imminent riot" and the Act's prohibition on "conduct such as committing acts of violence in furtherance of a riot, and aiding and abetting of that speech or conduct" were constitutional, since they addressed speech and actions directed to inciting or producing imminent lawless action and likely to incite or produce such action.

In 2019, Carney sentenced Adau Mornyang, an Australian model, to three years of probation and 100 hours of community service for causing an airline flight disturbance; Mornyang had pleaded guilty to felony interference with a flight crew and misdemeanor assault. 

From March 2020 until May 2021, during the COVID-19 pandemic, the U.S. District Court for the Central District of California temporarily halted both jury trials and bench trials to prevent the spread of the coronavirus. Carney was one of a minority of judges who believed that trials should continue, believing that doing so was crucial for preserving the parties' rights. Beginning in September 2020, he sought to summon jury pools to select jurors for trial, but this effort was blocked by Chief Judge Philip S. Gutierrez. In five criminal cases, Carney dismissed federal charges with prejudice on speedy trial grounds. The controversial decision led to an appeal by federal prosecutors to the Ninth Circuit. In April 2021, the Ninth Circuit reversed Carney's dismissal of the indictment in United States v. Olson, holding that Carney had misread the "ends of justice provision" of the Speedy Trial Act and that Carney's view (that a speedy trial is required unless it is impossible to hold a trial) was "an unnecessarily inflexible interpretation of a provision meant to provide necessary flexibility to district courts to manage their criminal cases."

Tenure as chief judge
Carney succeeded Virginia A. Phillips as Chief Judge of the Central District of California on June 1, 2020. However, he stepped down on June 26, 2020 in light of allegations that he had made racially insensitive comments regarding the Clerk of the Court, Kiry Gray, who is African American. Carney referred to Gray as "street smart" and telling her "it was not like I was the police officer standing on your neck." Carney apologized to Gray for the remark. He was succeeded as Chief Judge by Philip S. Gutierrez.

Personal life
Cormac Carney and wife MaryBeth have three children.

References

External links
 

|-

1959 births
Living people
21st-century American judges
American football wide receivers
American people of Irish descent
California state court judges
Harvard Law School alumni
Judges of the United States District Court for the Central District of California
Lawyers from Los Angeles
Memphis Showboats players
Players of American football from Long Beach, California
Players of American football from Detroit
Superior court judges in the United States
UCLA Bruins football players
United States Air Force Academy alumni
United States district court judges appointed by George W. Bush